The 1990 United States House of Representatives election in Vermont was held on Tuesday, November 6, 1990 to elect the U.S. representative from the state's at-large congressional district. The election coincided with the elections of other federal and state offices.

Republican primary

Candidates

Nominee
Peter Plympton Smith, incumbent U.S. Representative

Eliminated in Primary
Timothy Philbin, insurance agent

Endorsements

Results

Democratic primary

Candidates

Nominee
Dolores Sandoval, professor at the University of Vermont

Eliminated in Primary
Peter Diamondstone, socialist activist and perennial candidate
Bernie Sanders, former Mayor of Burlington, Vermont (Write-in)

Declined
Peter Welch, state senator

Results

Libertarian primary

General election
Smith, a liberal Republican, was considered to have acquitted himself well in his first congressional term, and The Washington Post noted that under most circumstances he would have been considered safely assured of re-election. However, the presence of Sanders, who was well known in Vermont and who was considered more famous than Smith, meant that he faced a tough re-election battle. Sanders, a democratic socialist, had narrowly lost to Smith in 1988, which was widely attributed to the presence of a strong Democratic candidate in the form of Vermont House Majority Leader Paul N. Poirier. No such event occurred during the 1990 cycle, as the Democratic nominee, Professor Dolores Sandoval, held positions to the left of Sanders on several issues, with her advocating for the legalisation of heroin.

Despite this Smith had an advantage in the polls until March 1990, when he backed a series of bills designed to alleviate the savings and loan crisis, including a bailout bill and a bill that cut funding for social programs. Sanders used Smith's support for these plans to tie him to President George H. W. Bush, who was unpopular in Vermont, and to portray him as overly supportive of the rich. Smith also faced backlash from voters for his support for extensive restrictions on guns, which earned him the enmity of several gun rights organizations. These organizations turned to Sanders as the only viable alternative even though his positions on guns were not radically different from Smith's. Feeling that he was losing ground in the race, Smith ran an ad campaign attempting to tie Sanders to left-wing authoritarian regimes such as Cuba, and attacking him for his self-declared democratic socialist views. This decision backfired, as Smith's tactics were denounced as "red-baiting" and "McCarthyism" in the press, and many Smith backers voiced their displeasure with the campaign.

Endorsements

Results

References

1990
Vermont
1990 Vermont elections
Bernie Sanders